Séamus O'Shea (born 1987) is a Gaelic footballer who plays for Breaffy and formerly of the Mayo county team. He is the brother of Mayo stars Aidan and Conor. Seamie was man-of-the-match in the 2013 Connacht Senior Football Championship final against London. He was nominated for an All-Star in 2013. O'Shea came on as a substitute in the 2012 All-Ireland Senior Football Championship Final, which Mayo lost by 0-13 to 2-11 against Donegal. In the 2013 All-Ireland final, he started at midfield as Mayo lost by a point to Dublin.

References

External links
GAA.ie Interview from 2012

1987 births
Living people
Mayo inter-county Gaelic footballers
Westmeath Gaelic footballers